Mark L. Lester (born November 26, 1946) is an American film director, screenwriter, and producer. He is known as a prolific director of cult films, including the disco musical Roller Boogie (1979), the vigilante thriller film Class of 1984 (1982), the Stephen King adaptation Firestarter (1984), the Arnold Schwarzenegger action film Commando (1985), the action-comedy Armed and Dangerous (1986), starring John Candy, Eugene Levy, and Meg Ryan and the buddy movie Showdown in Little Tokyo, starring Dolph Lundgren and Brandon Lee.

Career
After his debut in 1970 with the documentary film Twilight of the Mayas, Lester quickly became a prolific B-movie director/producer/writer, initially making his mark with a trio of road movies designed for the drive-in market: Steel Arena (1973), Truck Stop Women (1974), and Bobbie Jo and the Outlaw (1976). In 1977, he directed the high-concept thriller Stunts, an early outing for New Line Cinema, starring Robert Forster, Joanna Cassidy, and Richard Lynch, with a score composed by Michael Kamen. Two years later, he capitalized on the disco trend with Roller Boogie, starring Linda Blair. The film had a significantly higher budget than his previous films and was the first to be distributed by a major studio, to modest success. While it received negative reviews upon its initial release, it has since gained cult status as a proverbial time capsule of the bygone Disco Era. He then made the exploitation action crime-thriller Class of 1984, a film revolving around violence in an inner-city school. The Canadian-made production, which featured an early appearance by Michael J. Fox, was controversial at the time of release, but has since gained cult status.

Lester entered the mainstream in 1984 with the Stephen King adaptation Firestarter, and had his biggest hit the following year with Commando, a big-budget, Joel Silver-produced, Arnold Schwarzenegger action film that grossed over $57 million worldwide. In 1986, he directed and produced his first comedy, Armed and Dangerous, starring John Candy, Eugene Levy and Meg Ryan. In 1986, he formed Original Pictures, replacing his original production company Mark L. Lester Pictures, he had earlier established in the late 1970s, and had five films planned, source from the work of public domain with a $66 million budget. In 1987, he, by way of Mark Lester Films, had signed with upstart film production company Davis Entertainment for production of $5–10 million action films, which Davis produced, Lester directed and independently funded by two independent studios, and 70% of each pictures could be obtained for presale use. In 1990, he directed Class of 1999, a semi-sequel to Class of 1984, starring Malcolm McDowell, Pam Grier, and Stacy Keach. In 1991, he directed the cult classic Showdown in Little Tokyo, starring Dolph Lundgren and Brandon Lee.

Lester also founded American World Pictures, an independent production and distribution company. Other films include the thrillers Hitman's Run (1999) and Blowback (2000), and the TV movie Pterodactyl (2005), produced for the Sci Fi Channel. In 2012, he formed a new distribution company called Titan Global Entertainment.

In January 2013, almost 10 years after directing his last picture, Lester helmed the film Poseidon Rex on location in Belize. The production was disrupted briefly when lead actor Corin Nemec was severely injured during a boating accident while the Belizean Coast Guard was transporting the cast to set; Nemec was later replaced by Charmed co-star Brian Krause.

Personal life
Lester married Dana Dubovsky, with whom he had two children: Jason and Justin. The couple divorced in 2010. Lester also has a daughter from a prior relationship, Janessa (James), who is a musician and singer-songwriter.

Filmography

Feature films

Direct-to-video films

TV movies

Executive producer
 Yeti: Curse of the Snow Demon (2008) (Also story writer)
 Dragonwasps (2012)

References

External links
 

1946 births
Living people
American screenwriters
American film producers
American film directors
Action film directors
Horror film directors